The , also called simply , or even , were the most noble three branches of the Tokugawa clan of Japan: Owari, Kii, and Mito, all of which were descended from clan founder Tokugawa Ieyasu's three youngest sons, Yoshinao, Yorinobu, and Yorifusa, and were allowed to provide a shōgun in case of need. In the Edo period the term gosanke could also refer to various other combinations of Tokugawa houses, including (1) the shogunal, Owari and Kii houses and (2) the Owari, Kii, and Suruga houses (all with the court position of dainagon). 

Later, Gosanke were deprived of their role to provide a shōgun by three other branches that are closer to the shogunal house: the Gosankyō.

Even after the fall of the Tokugawa shogunate and the abolition of the Edo-period system of administrative domains (han) the three houses continued to exist in some form, as they do into the 21st century.

History 
After he established his shogunate, Ieyasu proceeded to put members of his family in key positions. Ninth son Yoshinao was nominated daimyō of Nagoya (Owari Province), tenth son Yorinobu daimyō of Wakayama (Kii Province) and eleventh son Yorifusa daimyō of Mito (Hitachi Province). Ieyasu gave them the right to supply a shōgun in order to ensure the presence of successors to the Tokugawa shogunate in case the main line should become extinct. This occurred twice during the Edo period: when the seventh shōgun died heirless in 1716, and when the thirteenth shōgun died heirless in 1858.

The three houses had the highest rank among the shinpan, the daimyōs who were relatives of the shōgun. After the Meiji Restoration, under the kazoku system, the heads of the three houses became marquesses. In 1929 the head of the Mito House was elevated from marquess to duke.

Owari branch
The senior one was the Owari branch. The first of this line was Tokugawa Yoshinao, ninth son of Ieyasu. He and his heirs were daimyōs of the Owari Domain (Owari Han), with its headquarters at Nagoya Castle. The fief had a rating of 619,500 koku, a koku being the quantity of rice necessary to feed one person for a year (about 180 liters), and was the largest of the three. Before the abolition of the shogunate and of the han system, the house was headed successively by 17 men. Its seniority notwithstanding, the Owari were the only one not to provide a shōgun.

Kii branch
Second in seniority was Kii or Kishū House. The founder was Tokugawa Yorinobu, the tenth son of Ieyasu. Yorinobu was daimyō of the Kishū Han with its castle at Wakayama and a rating of 555,000 koku. He entered Wakayama in 1619 when the previous daimyō was transferred. Fourteen members of the Tokugawa clan headed the fief during the Edo Period. It was the only family to directly produce successors to the shōgun, once in 1716 with Tokugawa Yoshimune and again in 1858 with Tokugawa Iemochi.  

The fifth Tokugawa daimyō of Kii was Yoshimune, who later became shōgun and appointed a relative to head the Kii Han. Yoshimune established three new houses, the gosankyō, installing two sons and a grandson as their heads. The gosanke provided the model for the gosankyō. However, while Yoshimune granted lands to the gosankyō, the lands were not consolidated into coherent han, but instead were scattered in various places; the total holdings were also smaller than those of the gosanke. Eventually, one of the gosankyō houses, the Hitotsubashi house, produced two shoguns, once in 1787 (Tokugawa Ienari) and again in 1866 (Tokugawa Yoshinobu).

Mito branch
Third in seniority among the Gosanke was the Mito branch. Its founder was Tokugawa Yorifusa, the eleventh son of Ieyasu. Their fief was the Mito Han in Hitachi Province, with its castle in Mito and lands rated initially at 250,000 koku, and later (1710) at 350,000. Eleven men headed the house, including Tokugawa (Mito) Mitsukuni. The Mito House was not allowed to provide a shōgun, but only his vice. It did manage however to produce one when one of its sons, Tokugawa Yoshinobu, was adopted by the Hitotsubashi (one of the Kii House's three Gosankyō) in 1848 and became the last shōgun as a member of that house.

Genealogy of the Gosanke heads

Owari branch

 Yoshinao
 Mitsutomo
 Tsunanari
 Yoshimichi
 Gorōta
 Tsugutomo
 Muneharu
 Munekatsu
 Munechika
 Naritomo
 Nariharu
 Naritaka
 Yoshitsugu
 Yoshikumi
 Mochinaga
 Yoshinori
 Yoshikatsu
 Yoshiakira
 Yoshichika
 Yoshitomo
 Yoshinobu
 Yoshitaka

The 22nd head of the Owari House is Mr.  (born 1961), who in 2005 succeeded his late father, becoming director of the Tokugawa Art Museum in Nagoya. A Tokyo resident, he commutes to Nagoya during weekends. His main activities are the museum and realty management.

Kii branch

Tokugawa Yorinobu (1601–1671, r. 1619–1667)
Mitsusada (1626–1705, r. 1667–1698)
Tsunanori (1665–1705, r. 1698–1705)
Yorimoto (1680–1705, r. 1705)
Yoshimune (1684–1751, r. 1705–1716) (later became shōgun with the same name)
Munenao (1682–1757, r. 1716–1757)
Munemasa (1720–1765, r. 1757–1765)
Shigenori (1746–1829, r. 1765–1775)
Harusada (1728–1789, r. 1775–1789)
Harutomi (1771–1852, r. 1789–1832)
Nariyuki (1801–1846, r. 1832–1846)
Narikatsu (1820–1849, r. 1846–1849)
Yoshitomi (1846–1866, r. 1849–1858) (later became shōgun with the name Iemochi)
Mochitsugu (1844–1906, r. 1858–1869)
Yorimichi (1872-1925, r. 1869-1925)
Yorisada (1892-1954, r. 1925-1954)
Yoriaki (1917-1958, r. 1954-1958)
Gō (1924-unknown, r. 1958-1965)
Kotoko (b.1956, r. 1965-still)

The 19th head of the Kii House is Ms.  (born in 1956). Although she is not married and has no children, she was chosen as head of the clan because there were no other direct descendants. An architect, she owns and operates her own construction company in Ginza, Tokyo. Unlike the other two, the Kii House does not have a museum of its own, and has given its properties of historical value to museums, such as the Wakayama Prefectural Museum. Effectively extinct

Mito branch
 Yorifusa
 Mitsukuni
 Tsunaeda
 Munetaka
 Munemoto
 Harumori
 Harutoshi
 Narinobu
 Nariaki
 Yoshiatsu
 Akitake
 Atsuyoshi
 Kuniyuki
 Kuninari
 Narimasa

The 15th head of the Mito House is Mr.  (born in 1958). From July 2009 he is also the director of Mito's . He presently works for Tokio Marine & Nichido Fire Insurance Co., Ltd. A Tokyo resident, he commutes to Mito on weekends.

Other uses of the term
In modern Japanese, the word gosanke is used to refer to "the strongest three" or "the most famous three" in various contexts.
The Otani Hotel was built in the Kioi district of Tokyo, where the Tokyo residence of the Kii House was located. The "8-bit gosanke", similarly to the "1977 trinity" in America, refers to the leading Japanese machines in the early home computing era.

Notes

References

 Asahi Shimbun, October 1, 2009, evening issue, page 1. Kafū sorezore Tokugawa Gosanke
 Iwanami  Japanese dictionary, 6th Edition (2008), DVD version
 Iwanami Nihonshi Jiten (岩波日本史辞典), CD-Rom Version. Iwanami Shoten, 1999–2001.
 Papinot, E. (1910). "Historical and Geographical Dictionary of Japan". 1972 Printing. Charles E. Tuttle Company, Tokyo, .